A1 Film Company is a Burmese-owned cinema company.

The company was awarded to the Myanmar Motion Picture Academy Awards.

It produced the 1940 film Chit Yay Sin and 1935 Japan Yin Thwe.

Key actors
 Tin Maung (1913–2000), a two-time Burmese Academy Award winning film actor, director and producer related to the film company.
 May Shin (1917–2008), a Burmese actress and singer.

References

Cinema of Myanmar